Lougratte is a commune and a village in the Lot-et-Garonne department in south-western France.

See also
Communes of the Lot-et-Garonne department

References

External links
http://www.lougratte.com/

Communes of Lot-et-Garonne